The 2015 Honduran Cup was the 10th staging of the Honduran Cup and the first edition since 1998.  Club Deportivo Olimpia are the defending champions. The 2015 Honduran Cup is referred to as the Copa Presidente de Honduras for sponsorship reasons.  The cup is a creation of the Honduran government funded by money allocated to national security fund.  Its purpose is to support the growth of sport to detract the youth from vices and to promote national tourism for rural towns.

The cup was contested by 64 teams from the top 3 divisions of the country.  There was a total of 10 teams from La Liga Nacional (First Division), 27 from Liga de Ascenso (Second Division) and 27 from Liga Mayor (Third Division).  It was the first cup in which teams outside the top division participated.  Some stipulations included that the lower seeded team hosted the matchup and five substitutions were allowed.  The first 4 rounds were single match with penalties if match ended in ties.  The quarterfinal and semifinal rounds were home-and-away while the one-match final was hosted in a neutral venue.

Participants
 Liga Nacional

 Honduras Progreso (El Progreso, Yoro)
 Marathón (San Pedro Sula, Cortes)
 Motagua (Tegucigalpa, Francisco Morazan)
 Olimpia (Tegucigalpa, Francisco Morazan)
 Parrillas One (Siguatepeque, Comayagua)

 Platense (Puerto Cortes, Cortes)
 Real España (San Pedro Sula, Cortes)
 Real Sociedad (Tocoa, Colon)
 Victoria (La Ceiba, Atlantida)
 Vida (La Ceiba, Atlantida)

 Liga de Ascenso

 Alianza Becerra (San Francisco de Becerra, Francisco Morazan)
 Arsenal (Coxen Hole, Roatan)
 Atlético Choloma (Choloma, Cortes)
 Atlético Esperanzano (La Esperanza, Intibuca)
 Atlético Independiente (Siguatepeque, Comayagua)
 Atlético Limeño (La Lima, Cortes)
 Atlético Municipal (Santa Cruz de Yojoa, Cortes)
 Atlético Olanchano (Catacamas, Olancho)
 Comayagua (Comayagua, Comayagua)
 Deportes Savio (Santa Rosa de Copan, Copan)
 Espartano (San Jose de Colinas, Santa Barbara)
 Graciano San Francisco (Gracias, Lempira)
 Jaguares UPNFM (Tegucigalpa, Francisco Morazan)

 Juticalpa (Juticalpa, Olancho)
 Lepaera (Lepaera, Lempira)
 Marcala (Marcala, Choluteca)
 Nacional Villanueva (Villanueva, Cortes)
 Real Honduras (San Luis, Santa Barbara)
 Real Juventud (Santa Barbara, Santa Barbara)
 San Juan (Quimistán, Santa Barbara)
 Social Sol (Olanchito, Yoro)
 Tela (Tela, Atlantida)
 Trujillo (Trujillo, Colon)
 Valle (Nacaome, Valle)
 Villanueva (Villanueva, Cortes)
 Yoro (Yoro, Yoro)

 Liga Mayor

 Atlético Boca Júnior (Tocoa, Colon)
 Atlético Calvario (Langue, Valle)
 Atlético Normalista (Gracias, Lempira)
 Barros (Cofradia, Cortes)
 Brisas (Taulabe, Comayagua)
 Casmul (San Manuel, Cortes)
 Concepción (San Marcos, Ocotepeque)
 Estrella Roja (Danli, El Paraiso)
 FAS (Santiago de Puringla, La Paz)
 Galaxis (Coxen Hole, Roatan)
 Gimnástico (Tegucigalpa, Francisco Morazan)
 Gracias a Dios (Puerto Lempira, Gracias a Dios)
 Independiente (Monjaras, Choluteca)

 Juventus (Guaimaca, Francisco Morazan)
 Las Mercedes (La Ceiba, Atlantida)
 Lenca
 Merari (Santa Rosa de Copan, Copan)
 Merendón (Azacualpa, Santa Barbara)
 Oro Verde (El Paraíso) (Oro Verde, El Paraiso)
 Oro Verde (Santa Rita) (Santa Rita, Yoro)
 Palmeras (Sonaguera, Colon)
 Rayos (La Entrada, Copan)
 San José Clash (San Jose Pueblo, Atlantida)
 San Juan Bosco (Choluteca, Choluteca)
 San Lorenzo (San Lorenzo, Valle)
 Sulimán (Juticalpa, Olancho)

Schedule and format
The first round schedule was announced on 14 November 2014.  The final will be a single match to be held at Estadio Nilmo Edwards in La Ceiba.

Prize fund

First round

Second round

Round of 16

Quarterfinals
The draw was done at President's House on 20 March.

1st legs

2nd legs

Semifinals

1st legs

2nd legs

Third Place

Final

References

Honduran Cup seasons
Cup